Lucy Wadham (born 1964) is a British novelist and writer of crime fiction. Her most widely reviewed work is her autobiographical account of her life in France, The Secret Life of France (2009).

Wadham was born in London and educated at Magdalen College, Oxford. In 1989, she worked as a news assistant at the BBC Paris bureau and has been a freelance print journalist since 1994. She has contributed regularly to The Guardian, The Spectator, and the New Statesman. She lives in France with her four children.

Her first novel, Lost (2000), a thriller set on Corsica, was shortlisted for the Macallan Gold Dagger Award. The second novel, Castro's Dream (2003), about the Basque separatist movement ETA, is set in the Basque Country. Greater Love (2007), set in Portugal, Paris and Morocco in 2001, tells the story of Aisha and her quest to understand her twin brother's conversion to Islam. Wadham's 2009 book, The Secret Life of France,  is part memoir and part essay focussing on the cultural differences between Britain and France. She writes a blog on the same theme under the same name. Her 2013 book, Heads and Straights, part of Penguin's series celebrating the 150th anniversary of the London Underground, traces her family's recent history through the lens of social class provided by growing up in Chelsea during the rise of punk rock.

In 2020 Wadham's first collection of poetry, 'Fold' published by Pindrop Press, was shortlisted for the Seamus Heaney First Poetry Collection Prize.

Bibliography 
Lost, Faber and Faber, 2000, 
Castro's Dream, Faber and Faber, 2003, 
Greater Love, Faber and Faber, 2007, 
The Secret Life of France, Faber and Faber, 2009, 
Heads and Straights, Penguin, 2013, 
Parfaite, L'Avant Scène Théâtre - Collection des Quatre-Vents, 2014, 
Fold, Pindrop Press, 2020,

References

External links
 Blog

1964 births
Living people
Writers from London
Alumni of Magdalen College, Oxford
English crime fiction writers
English women novelists
Women autobiographers
Women mystery writers
English expatriates in France
English autobiographers
English women non-fiction writers